Georgios Kountouriotis (1782 – 13 March 1858) was a Greek ship-owner and politician who served as prime minister from March to October 1848.

Life
He was born in 1782 on the Saronic island of Hydra to an Arvanite family. The family, apparently the richest in independent Greece, stemmed from the younger son of an Albanian peasant. He settled the island as a boatman after the Venetians left the Peloponnese (1715) but before the island received its permanent colony. The Koundouriotis family used extensively their native Arvanitic dialect of Hydra. The dialect has been documented in two letters of Georgios' private correspondence with Ioannis Orlandos, written in the Greek alphabet. Georgios spoke Greek only with difficulty. He was the brother of Lazaros Kountouriotis, another ship-owner of the Greek War of Independence. 

When the War of Independence broke out, Georgios, along with the rest of the Kountouriotis family, supported the effort with generous donations as well as with their ships. He was often at odds with other Hydriot sea captains, but ultimately was the wealthiest. Georgios Kountouriotis became a member of the executive committee of the Greek Revolution and served as its president from 1823 to 1826 during the crucial time of the siege of Missolonghi.

After independence, he became a member of the cabinet of Ioannis Kapodistrias, the first governor of Greece. He was a semi-independent adherent of the French Party mostly due to his antipathy to the Russian Party and his fellow Hydriots of the English Party. During the period of French Party ascendancy in the reign of King Otto, he served as Prime Minister.

He died in 1858.

He was the grandfather of Pavlos Kountouriotis who fought in the First Balkan War and later served as first (1924-1926) President of the Second Hellenic Republic.

References

1782 births
1858 deaths
19th-century heads of state of Greece
19th-century prime ministers of Greece
19th-century Greek businesspeople
Arvanites
Prime Ministers of Greece
People from Hydra (island)
Greek people of the Greek War of Independence
Ministers of Naval Affairs of Greece
Greek businesspeople in shipping